The Canadian Wild, officially the Canadian Wild of Southern Illinois, is a professional women's softball team based in Marion, Illinois. They were founded in 2019 as part of National Pro Fastpitch and are partnered with the Canada women's national softball team. The team is composed entirely of Canadian players and is essentially the Canada women's national softball team and allows the team to play against top competition for most of the year, although there are some other players from Softball Canada on the roster.

History
They made their debut in the 2019 National Pro Fastpitch season, playing out of Rent One Park, in Marion, Illinois. They began the season with a six-game series sweep of the Beijing Eagles. They finished their first season in third place out of six teams, finishing with a 22–20 record. 

Due to the COVID-19 pandemic, the team announced they were withdrawing from the 2020 NPF season, becoming the second team to withdraw from the season, after the Aussie Peppers, due to the pandemic. The NPF eventually cancelled the entire season, as well as the 2021 season.

Current players

References

External links
Official Site

Softball teams in the United States
Sports teams in Illinois
National Pro Fastpitch teams
2019 establishments in Illinois
Sports clubs established in 2019
Marion, Illinois
Softball in Canada